Microphysogobio yunnanensis is a species of cyprinid fish found in the upper Mekong River basin in China and the Búa River in northern Vietnam.

References

Microphysogobio
Fish described in 1977